Kendall Katwalk is a 150 yard long narrow pathway blasted out of a steeply sloped granite rock face on the north ridge of Kendall Peak approximately 6 miles northeast of Snoqualmie Pass. It is a segment of Section J of Pacific Crest Trail and the construction was completed in 1979. It is a popular destination for day hikers, trail runners, and backpackers

See also 
 Mount_Katahdin's Knife Edge

References

External links
 Washington Trail Association - Hiking guide - Kendall Katwalk

Landforms of Kittitas County, Washington
Hiking trails in Washington (state)